Mariusz Krzysztof Czerkawski (pronounced ; born 13 April 1972) is a Polish former professional ice hockey player who played in the National Hockey League (NHL) for the Boston Bruins, Edmonton Oilers, New York Islanders, Montreal Canadiens and Toronto Maple Leafs. In addition to playing in the NHL, Czerkawski played for several different European-based teams. A consistent scorer, Czerkawski was the first player born and trained in Poland to play in the NHL. Internationally, Czerkawski represented Poland at several international tournaments, including the 1992 Winter Olympics and the 1992 and 2002 World Championships.

Playing career
Czerkawski first played hockey when he was 8-years-old, and from a young age was part of the GKS Tychy program. After a strong season with GKS Tychy in 1990–91, where he scored 40 points in 24 games, the Boston Bruins drafted him in the 1991 NHL Entry Draft in the fifth round, 105th overall, while Czerkawski joined Djurgårdens IF of the Elitserien for the 1991–92 season. He was the first foreign player to play for Djurgårdens since Canadian Steve Cardwell in 1976–77. Czerkawski did not play often during his first season, and finished with 13 points in 39 games. Loaned to Hammarby of the second-tier Division 1 for 1992–93, Czerkawski greatly improved, and was brought back to Djurgårdens for 1993–94, recording 34 points in 39 games.

After the season ended Czerkawski went to North America, making his National Hockey League (NHL) debut at the end of the 1993–94 NHL season with the Bruins, playing his first game on April 9 against the Tampa Bay Lightning. He scored his first goal on April 13, his third game, against the Ottawa Senators, and finished the season with two goals and one assist in four games.  Though previous NHL players had been born in Poland, Czerkawski was the first Polish-trained NHLer. The next season, he played 47 games with the Bruins, collecting 12 goals and 14 assists in a lockout-shortened season.

In 1996, Czerkawski was traded to the Edmonton Oilers. He played season and a half there before another trade sent him to the New York Islanders, where he would have his most productive years, including two 30-goal plus seasons and being named to the 2000 NHL All-Star Game. However, after being traded to the Montreal Canadiens in 2002, he found himself sent to their American Hockey League (AHL) affiliate, the Hamilton Bulldogs. His contract was then bought-out by Montreal, after which he signed a one-year contract with the Islanders in 2003, recording another 25-goal season.

The 2004–05 NHL lockout saw the NHL not play in 2004–05, so Czerkawski joined Djurgårdens for the season, where he had 24 points in 46 games. Returning to the NHL, he signed as a free agent with the Toronto Maple Leafs. He played 19 games for the Maple Leafs, scoring 5 points, before being put on waivers and being claimed by the Boston Bruins on 7 March 2006. He played 16 games with the Bruins, scoring four goals and one assist.

Czerkawski joined the Rapperswil-Jona Lakers of the Swiss National League A (NLA) in 2006. He played two seasons for the club, collecting respectively 41 and 53 points. He retired in 2008, though returned to play one final match for Tychy in January 2009.

International play
Czerkawski's first international tournament with the Polish national under-18 team was at the 1989 European U18 Division BChampionship, where he recorded 11 points in 5 games and helped Poland earn promotion to the top level for 1990. Joining the team at the 1990 tournament, he had 12 points in 6 games. He also played for Poland at the 1990 World Junior Championship, scoring one goal in seven games. Poland was relegated to Pool B (the second tier) for 1991, where Czerkawski had 12 goals and 3 assists, for 15 points, in 7 games. He also made his debut for the Polish senior team that year, playing in Pool B at the 1991 World Championships and scoring 8 points in 7 games and helping Poland earn promotion to the top tier for the following year.

At the 1992 Winter Olympics Czerkawski played five games, and had one assist. He played a further 6 games at the 1992 World Championships, but did not score any points. It would not be until 1998 that Czerkawski again played internationally, joining Poland at the renamed Group B of the World Championships, where he had 3 points in 3 games. He would return again in 2000 and had 11 points in 7 games. Poland had earned promotion to the 2002 World Championship and Czerkawski scored 4 points in 3 games, though Poland was relegated back to the second tier (then known as Division I). His final tournament would be at the 2006 World Championship Division I, where he had 7 points in 5 games.

Personal life
Czerkawski was married from 1996 to 1998 to Polish-Swedish actress Izabella Scorupco, and they have a daughter. Since 1 September 2007, he has been married to Emilia Raszyńska, with whom he has a son. After retiring from ice hockey, he took up golf.

For his contribution to the development of Polish ice hockey, Czerkawski received the Knight's Cross of the Order of Polonia Restituta (5th Class) in 2004.

Career statistics

Regular season and playoffs

International

All Star Games

 All statistics taken from NHL.com

Awards

International

References

External links
 
  

1972 births
Living people
Boston Bruins draft picks
Boston Bruins players
Djurgårdens IF Hockey players
Edmonton Oilers players
Espoo Blues players
GKS Tychy (ice hockey) players
Hamilton Bulldogs (AHL) players
Hammarby Hockey (1921–2008) players
Ice hockey players at the 1992 Winter Olympics
Knights of the Order of Polonia Restituta
Montreal Canadiens players
National Hockey League All-Stars
New York Islanders players
Olympic ice hockey players of Poland
People from Radomsko
Polish expatriate sportspeople in Canada
Polish expatriate sportspeople in Finland
Polish expatriate sportspeople in Sweden
Polish expatriate sportspeople in Switzerland
Polish expatriate sportspeople in the United States
Polish ice hockey right wingers
SC Rapperswil-Jona Lakers players
Sportspeople from Łódź Voivodeship
Toronto Maple Leafs players